Franz Peter Wirth (22 September 1919 in Munich – 17 October 1999 in Berg, Upper Bavaria) was a German film director and screenwriter. His film Helden was nominated for an Academy Award for Best Foreign Language Film in 1958.

Selected filmography

Film
1958:  — (based on The Deruga Case by Ricarda Huch)
1958: Arms and the Man — (based on Arms and the Man by George Bernard Shaw)
1959: People in the Net — (based on a story by Will Tremper)
1959: 
1960: The Woman by the Dark Window
1961: Girl from Hong Kong — (based on a novel by )
1963:  — (based on a novel by Oliver Hassencamp)
1964: A Man in His Prime — (based on a novel by Rudolf Schneider)
1973:  — (remake of It Started with Eve)

Television
1954: Das Brot des Malers Luschek – (screenplay by )
1954: Oskar kommt mit der dritten Stadtbahn – (based on a radio play by Max Gundermann)
1954: Der Weihnachtsgast – (based on a play by Charles Vildrac)
1955: Chiarevalle wird entdeckt – (based on a play by Nicola Manzari)
1955: Unruhige Nacht – (based on Arrow to the Heart by Albrecht Goes)
1955: Das Telefon oder Die Liebe zu dritt – (based on The Telephone by Gian Carlo Menotti)
1955: Alle meine Söhne – (based on All My Sons by Arthur Miller)
1956: Meine Schwester und ich – (based on Meine Schwester und ich)
1956: Der Hexer – (based on The Ringer by Edgar Wallace)
1956: Schmutzige Hände – (based on Dirty Hands by Jean-Paul Sartre)
1956: Der schöne Gleichgültige – (based on Le Bel Indifférent by Jean Cocteau)
1956: Jeanne oder Die Lerche – (based on The Lark by Jean Anouilh)
1957: Korruption – (based on Corruzione al Palazzo di giustizia by Ugo Betti)
1957: Der Richter und sein Henker – (based on The Judge and His Hangman by Friedrich Dürrenmatt)
1957: Bernarda Albas Haus – (based on The House of Bernarda Alba by Federico García Lorca)
1958: Glaube Liebe Hoffnung – (based on a play by Ödön von Horváth)
1958: Der kaukasische Kreidekreis – (based on The Caucasian Chalk Circle by Bertolt Brecht)
1958: Der Tod des Handlungsreisenden – (based on Death of a Salesman by Arthur Miller)
1959: Konto ausgeglichen – (based on The Embezzler by James M. Cain)
1959: Raskolnikoff – (based on Dostoevsky's Crime and Punishment)
1961: Hamlet – (based on Shakespeare's Hamlet)
1961: Alle meine Söhne – (based on All My Sons by Arthur Miller)
1961: Zahlungsaufschub – (based on Payment Deferred by C. S. Forester)
1961: Der Fall Winslow – (based on The Winslow Boy by Terence Rattigan)
1962: Der Hausmeister – (based on The Caretaker by Harold Pinter)
1962: Wallenstein – (based on Wallenstein by Friedrich Schiller)
1962: Zaubereien oder Die Tücke des Objekts
1963: Was Ihr wollt – (based on Shakespeare's Twelfth Night)
1963: Don Carlos – (based on Don Carlos by Friedrich Schiller)
1964: Der Hund des Generals – (based on a play by Heinar Kipphardt)
1964: Karl Sand – (film about Karl Ludwig Sand)
1964: Die Geschichte von Joel Brand – (based on the story of Joel Brand, written by Alexander Weissberg-Cybulski)
1965:  – (based on a radio play by )
1965: Der Ruepp – (based on a novel by Ludwig Thoma)
1965: Antigone – (based on Antigone by Jean Anouilh)
1965: Rückkehr von den Sternen – (based on Revenu de l'étoile by André Obey)
1966: Herzliches Beileid – (based on Feu la mère de Madame by Georges Feydeau)
1966: Geschlossene Gesellschaft – (based on No Exit by Jean-Paul Sartre)
1966: Der Regenmacher – (based on The Rainmaker by N. Richard Nash)
1966: Ein Schloß – (based on a play by Ivan Klíma)
1967:  (TV miniseries) – (based on a novel by Kenneth Donald)
1967: Das Attentat – Der Tod des Engelbert Dollfuss – (docudrama about the Austrian July Putsch 1934)
1967: Nathan der Weise – (based on Nathan the Wise by Gotthold Ephraim Lessing)
1967: Der schöne Gleichgültige – (based on Le Bel Indifférent by Jean Cocteau)
1967: Walther Rathenau – Untersuchung eines Attentats – (docudrama about the assassination of Walther Rathenau)
1968: Schinderhannes – (based on Schinderhannes by Carl Zuckmayer)
1968: Schmutzige Hände – (based on Dirty Hands by Jean-Paul Sartre)
1968: Die Schlacht bei Lobositz – (based on a play by Peter Hacks)
1968: Othello – (based on Shakespeare's Othello)
1969: Alte Kameraden – (screenplay by George Hurdalek)
1969: Die Zimmerschlacht – (based on a play by Martin Walser)
1969: Al Capone im deutschen Wald – (based on a novel by  about )
1969: Verraten und verkauft – (based on a novel by )
1970: Das Haus Lunjowo – (docudrama about the National Committee for a Free Germany)
1970: Die Marquise von B. – (film about Madame de Brinvilliers)
1971: Change – (based on a play by Wolfgang Bauer)
1971: Willy und Lilly – (screenplay by )
1971:  – (docudrama about the 20 July plot)
1971: Die Messe der erfüllten Wünsche – (based on a novella by Vladimír Páral)
1972: Die rote Kapelle (TV miniseries) – (series about the Red Orchestra)
1972: Eisenwichser – (based on a play by )
1972–1973: Alexander Zwo (TV miniseries)
1973: Nicht einmal das halbe Leben – (based on a novel by Alexandr Kliment)
1974: Der zerbrochene Krug – (based on The Broken Jug by Heinrich von Kleist)
1974: Synchron oder Man kann auch anders – (screenplay by Robert Neumann)
1974: Plus minus null
1974: Strychnin und saure Drops – (anthology film, screenplay by )
1975: Tatort: 
1975: Der Biberpelz – (based on The Beaver Coat by Gerhart Hauptmann)
1975: Derrick: Paddenberg
1975: Der Wittiber – (based on a novel by Ludwig Thoma)
1975: Ein schönes Paar – (based on a play by John O'Hara)
1975: Baby Hamilton oder Das kommt in den besten Familien vor – (based on a play by Maurice Braddell and Anita Hart)
1975: Die Verschwörung des Fiesco zu Genua – (based on Schiller's Fiesco)
1976: Julia und Romeo – (What if Romeo and Juliet survived?)
1976: Insel der Rosen – (based on a play by Sławomir Mrożek)
1976: Minna von Barnhelm – (based on Minna von Barnhelm by Gotthold Ephraim Lessing)
1976: Derrick: Risiko
1976: Die Leute von Feichtenreut – (based on a novel by )
1977: Emigranten – (based on a play by Sławomir Mrożek)
1977: Roulette – (based on a play by Pavel Kohout)
1977:  – (screenplay by Sebastian Haffner, docudrama about the Battle of the Marne)
1977: Ein Mann wird jünger – (based on a play by Italo Svevo)
1978:  (TV miniseries) – (based on a Wallenstein biography by Golo Mann)
1979: The Buddenbrooks (TV miniseries) – (based on Buddenbrooks by Thomas Mann)
1980: Tatort: Mit nackten Füßen
1982: Georg Thomallas Geschichten (TV series, 2 episodes)
1982: Egmont – (based on Goethe's Egmont)
1983:  – (based on Deep Water by Patricia Highsmith)
1984:  (TV miniseries) – (based on a novel by Theodor Fontane)
1984: Hildes Endspiel – Eine Vorstadtballade
1984: Don Carlos – (based on Don Carlos by Friedrich Schiller)
1984: Geld oder Leben – (anthology film)
1984–1985: Polizeiinspektion 1 (TV series, 6 episodes)
1986: Die Wächter (TV miniseries) – (based on The Guardians by John Christopher)
1986: Spätes Erröten – (based on The Understanding by Angela Huth)
1986: Zerbrochene Brücken – (based on the autobiography of Lily Braun)
1987: Derrick: Koldaus letzte Reise
1987: Wallenstein – (based on Wallenstein by Friedrich Schiller)
1987: Derrick: Mordfall Goos
1988: Familienschande – (based on Family Skeletons by Patrick Quentin)
1989: 
1990: Notenwechsel
1990: Derrick: Solo für Vier
1992: Dornberger
1992–1993: Weißblaue Geschichten (TV series, 2 episodes)
1994–1995: Frankenberg (TV series, 15 episodes)
1996: Der Mann ohne Schatten (TV series, 2 episodes)
1996:  – (based on a novel by Barbara Noack)
1997:  (TV series, 6 episodes)
1998:  (TV series, 3 episodes)
1999: Typisch Ed!

References

External links

1919 births
1999 deaths
Mass media people from Munich
20th-century screenwriters